1995 Dakar Rally also known as the 1995 Paris-Dakar Rally was the 17th running of the Dakar Rally event. The race began outside France for the first time, at Granada in Spain. Pierre Lartigue won the car class for the second year in succession and Stephane Peterhansel won his fourth motorcycle title. Karel Loprais won the truck title in a Tatra 815.

References

Dakar Rally
D
1995 in French motorsport
1995 in African sport